Evald Flisar (born 13 February 1945) is a Slovene writer, poet, playwright, editor and translator. He was president of the Slovene Writers' Association for three consecutive terms between 1995 and 2002 and is editor-in-chief of the literary and cultural magazine Sodobnost.

Biography 

Flisar was born in 1945 in Gerlinci in the Prekmurje region of eastern Slovenia. He attended secondary school in Murska Sobota and studied comparative literature at the University of Ljubljana, English and English literature at Chiswick Polytechnic in London and for a while in Australia. Many of his books are travelogues and he is also an acclaimed playwright. He received the Prešeren Foundation Award in 1993 for his travelogue Popotnik v kraljestvu senc and his plays Kaj pa Leonardo? and Jutri bo lepše.

Published works

Poetry 
 Symphonia poetica (1966)

Prose 
 Mrgolenje prahu (1968, novel)
 Umiranje v ogledalu (1969, novel)
 Tisoč in ena pot (1979, travelogue)
 Južno od severa (1981, travelogue)
 Lov na lovca (1984, short stories)
 Čarovnikov vajenec (1986, novel)
 Noro življenje (1989, travelogue)
 Popotnik v kraljestvu senc (1992, travelogue)
 Potovanje predaleč (1998, novel)
 Zgodbe s poti (2000, short stories)
 Velika žival samote (2001, novel)
 Ljubezni tri in ena smrt (2002, novel)
 Čaj s kraljico (2004, novel)
 Mogoče nikoli (2007, novel)
 Opazovalec (2009, novel)
 Na zlati obali (2010, novel)
 To nisem jaz: legoromaIstros Booksn (2011, novel)
 Dekle, ki bi raje bilo drugje (2012, novel)
 Začarani Odisej (2013, novel)

Prose Translated into English
 My Father's Dreams, Istros Books, London 2015.

Plays 
 Sodniška zgradba (1969, radio play)
 Vojaki ob koncu vojne (1970, radio play)
 Kostanjeva krona (1970)
 Ukradena hiša (1972, radio play)
 Nimfa umre (1989)
 Jutri bo lepše (1992)
 Kaj pa Leonardo? (1992)
 Naglavisvet (1993, radio play)
 Tristan in Izolda: igra o ljubezni in smrti (1994)
 Stric iz Amerike (1994)
 Iztrohnjeno srce (1995)
 Temna stran svetlobe (1995, radio play)
 Angleško poletje (1997, radio play)
 Sončne pege (1998)
 Padamo, padamo (1998)
 Poslednja nedolžnost (1999)
 Enajsti planet (2000)
 Nora Nora (2004)
 Akvarij (2007)
 Alica v nori deželi (2010)
 Antigona zdaj (2012)

Children's literature 
 Pikpokec postane svetovni prvak (2007)
 Alica v nori deželi (2008)

References

1945 births
Living people
People from the Municipality of Cankova
Slovenian editors
Slovenian dramatists and playwrights
Slovenian novelists
Slovenian male short story writers
Slovenian short story writers
Presidents of the Slovene Writers' Association
Slovenian children's writers
University of Ljubljana alumni
20th-century Slovenian writers
21st-century Slovenian writers
20th-century male writers